Derived from the words hydraulics and pneumatics, pneudraulics is the term used when discussing systems on military aircraft that use either or some combination of hydraulic and pneumatic systems.

The science of fluids made of both gas and liquid.

Pneudraulic systems
Landing gear
Flaps and slats
Rudder
Ailerons
Speed brake
Wheel brakes
Nose wheel steering

Fluid power